Bunsenite is the naturally occurring form of nickel(II) oxide, NiO. It occurs as rare dark green crystal coatings. It crystallizes in the cubic crystal system and occurs as well formed cubic, octahedral and dodecahedral crystals. It is a member of the periclase group.

It was first described in 1868 for a sample from a hydrothermal nickel-uranium vein from Johanngeorgenstadt, Erzgebirge, Saxony, Germany and named for German chemist Robert William Eberhard Bunsen (1811–1899). Other occurrences include west of the Scotia talc mine near Bon Accord, Barberton district, Transvaal, South Africa and from Kambalda south of Kalgoorlie, Western Australia. The South African occurrence has evidence of thermal metamorphism of a nickel-rich meteorite. It occurs associated with native bismuth, annabergite, aerugite, xanthiosite in Germany; and with liebenbergite, trevorite, nickeloan serpentine, nickeloan ludwigite, violarite, millerite, gaspeite, nimite and bonaccordite in the South African occurrence.

References

Oxide minerals
Nickel minerals
Cubic minerals
Minerals in space group 225
Rocksalt group